Simonavičius is the masculine form of a Lithuanian family name. Its feminine forms  are: Simonavičienė (married woman or widow) and Simonavičiūtė (unmarried woman).

The surname may refer to:

Kazimieras Simonavičius (1600–1651),  Polish-Lithuanian general of artillery
Jaunius Simonavičius (born 1954), Lithuanian politician, viceminister

Lithuanian-language surnames